The primary biochemical reaction catalyzed by the enzyme adenosylcobalamin/α-ribazole phosphatase (formerly α-ribazole phosphatase) (EC 3.1.3.73) is

adenosylcobalamin 5′-phosphate + H2O = coenzyme B12 + phosphate

This enzyme can also catalyze the following reaction in vitro, however it is not the biologically relevant reaction

α-ribazole 5′-phosphate + H2O  α-ribazole + phosphate

This enzyme belongs to the family of hydrolases, specifically those acting on phosphoric monoester bonds.  The systematic name is adenosylcobalamin/α-ribazole-5′-phosphate phosphohydrolase. This enzyme is also called CobC. It is part of the biosynthetic pathway to cobalamin (vitamin B12) in bacteria.

See also
 Cobalamin biosynthesis

Structural studies

References

EC 3.1.3
Enzymes of known structure